Tahuna is a town and the capital of Sangihe Islands Regency in North Sulawesi province, Indonesia. It stretches across the administrative districts (kecamatan) of Tahuna, Tahuna Timur and Tahuna Barat, with a combined population of 35,307 at the 2020 Census.

Climate
Tahuna has a tropical rainforest climate (Af) with heavy to very heavy rainfall year-round.

References

Populated places in North Sulawesi